Bor may refer to:

Places

Populated places
 Bor (Tachov District), a town in Plzeň Region, Czech Republic
 Bor, Petnjica, Montenegro
 Bor, Russia, the name of many inhabited localities in Russia
 Bor District, a district in Serbia
 Bor, Serbia, a town in Bor District
 Bor, South Sudan, the capital of Jonglei State, South Sudan
 Bor County, in Jonglei State, South Sudan
 Bor, Sweden, a village in Jönköping County, Sweden
 Bor, Niğde, a district center of Niğde Province, Turkey
 Bór (disambiguation), various settlements in Poland

Other places
 Bor (Martian crater)
 Bor (PKP station), a former railway station in Hel, Poland
 Bor Airport (South Sudan)

People
Bor (name), notable people with this surname or given name

Fiction and mythology
Borr, sometimes anglicized Bor, a god in Norse mythology, father of the god Odin
Bor (comics), an Asgardian in the Marvel Universe

Other
 Bill of rights
 Bor fruit, more commonly known as Ber
 Bor language (disambiguation), the name of two languages in South Sudan
 Bor rifle, Polish sniper rifle
 OFK Bor, a football club based in Bor, Serbia

See also
 
 Bór (disambiguation)
 BOR (disambiguation)
 Bors (disambiguation)
 Borş (disambiguation)